The All-Ireland Senior Camogie Championship is a competition for inter-county teams in the women's field sport of game of camogie played in Ireland. The series of games are organised by the Camogie Association and are played during the summer months with the All-Ireland Camogie Final being played on the second Sunday in September in Croke Park, Dublin. The prize for the winning team is the O'Duffy Cup.

The men's equivalent tournament is the All-Ireland Senior Hurling Championship.

Participants
The county is a geographical region in Ireland, and each county organises its own camogie affairs. Twelve Counties currently participate in the Senior Championship following the promotion of Intermediate champions Down at the end of the 2020 season. These are Clare, Cork, Down, Dublin, Galway, Kilkenny, Limerick, Offaly, Tipperary, Waterford, Westmeath and Wexford.

Format
The counties participate in a group series with the top teams progressing to the knock-out stages. The eight teams were divided into two groups of four in 2009. In every other year the teams were placed in a single group of between six and eight teams. The first two championships were played on an open draw basis until in 1934 the championship was changed to the traditional quadro-provincial structure traditional to Gaelic games. Following the withdrawal of Connacht from the inter-provincial senior semi-finals the competition changed to an open-draw knockout system in 1974.

Introduction of group system in 2006
The championship structure was changed from a knockout to a round-robin system in 2006. The system was retained despite some initial criticism. An anomaly occurred in four of the first six championships under the new format (2006, 2008, 2010 and 2011) with the defeated All-Ireland finalists beating the eventual champions in the group stages, only to eventually lose to the same opposition in the All-Ireland final:
In 2006 Tipperary beat Cork by 3-8 to 1-10 in the group stages only to lose the final 0-12 to 0-4
 In 2008, Cork beat Galway 1-9 to 0-9 in the group stages only to lose the final 2-10 to 1-8,
 In 2010, Galway beat Wexford 1-8 to 0-10 in the group stages only to lose the final 1-12 to 1-10
 and in 2011 involving the same counties, Galway beat Wexford by a massive 2-14 to 0-9 in the group stages only to lose the final 2-7 to 1-8.

Roll of Honour

Winners by county
Cork  have won the All-Ireland Senior Camogie Championship the most times – twenty-eight titles. Dublin have 26 Titles. Dublin won their very first All-Ireland title in 1932 and went on to dominate the competition for the next thirty five years. Between 1948 and 1955 they won eight consecutive titles in-a-row. Two years later in 1957 Dublin began another great run of success which ended in 1966 with the capturing of their tenth consecutive All-Ireland title. Had it not been for defeats in 1947, 1956 and 1967 it is reasonable to assume that Dublin could have captured twenty-one All-Ireland titles in succession. For a twenty-year period from 1974 until 1994 the Kilkenny camogie team dominated the championship. Between 1999 and 2006 Tipp won five All-Ireland titles from eight consecutive final appearances. Since 1998 Cork have won nine All-Ireland titles, their latest coming in 2018.

Six counties - Louth (1934 and 1936), Waterford (1945), Down (1948), Derry (1954), Mayo (1959) and Limerick (1980) each appeared in All-Ireland finals without ever winning the O’Duffy Cup while London appeared in the All-Ireland final "proper", effectively a play-off between the All-Ireland champions and British provincial champions in 1949 and 1950. Three counties, Kildare (1933), Cavan (1940 and 1941) and Clare (1944, and 1978) have contested the All-Ireland semi-final without qualifying for a final. The following is a list of the top county teams by number of wins.
Click on the year for details and team line-outs from each individual championship.

Winners by Province

Highlights and incidents
Highlights and incidents through the history of the championship include:
The first final in which Dublin, captained by Association president Máire Gill and helped by two Bray players, beat Galway 3-2 to 0-2 at Galway Sportsfield in the summer of 1933, refereed by Stephen Jordan TD.
Six goals (of Cork's seven) scored by Kitty Buckley of Old Aloysius for Cork v Dublin n the 1941 final.
The 1942 final, broadcast on radio for the first time and the 1943 final between Dublin and Cork which set an attendance record of 9,136. In the absence of accurate figures for the 1962 final which may have had a higher attendance, it set a record that stood until 1995.
The rival 1945 “official” and “unofficial” finals, the result of splits in the association which occurred intermittently between 1938 and 1951, with a number of "official" and "unofficial" competitions, "new" and "old" associations and widespread confusion. Cork had pulled out of the 1944 Munster championship and Dublin pulled out of the 1945 All-Ireland championship over the dispute over male officials.
The 1946 final in Corrigan Park on front of a gate of £230, in which Antrim defeated Cork, leading to Corrigan Park's depiction by the press as the "home of camogie."
The 1948 final won by CIE club who represented Dublin en masse, as the county board was in dispute with the association.
The 1949 home final in which Kathleen Cody scored 6-7 of Dublin's 8-7 total in the final.
Dublin's winning streak, longest in the history of Gaelic games, winning 18 out of 19 titles between 1948 and 1966. They were unbeaten in the Leinster championship between July 26, 1936, and June 2, 1968. Kathleen Mills won 15 All-Ireland medals between 1941 and 1962, Sophie Brack won eight All-Ireland medals in succession and competed in nine successive finals. Úna O'Connor won ten All-Ireland medals.
Sophie Brack's four goals in the 1951 final.
The 1955 final between Dublin and Cork, regarded as the greatest of its era, with the performance of Sophie Brack rated as the best individual display.
Antrim's victory over Dublin in the 1956 semi-final to prevent 19-in-a-row, Marian Kearns scoring the winning goal. Antrim's star goalkeeper in the semi-final and final victory over Cork, Theresa Cairns, was just 14.
Dublin's revenge victory over Antrim in 1957 with a last-minute winning goal from Bríd Reid followed by a dramatic goal line save by Eileen Duffy.
Judy Doyle's four goals in the 1964 final and five in the 1965 final.
The extraordinary end to the 1966 semi-final between Dublin and Tipperary when Tipperary, expecting to have won by a point, were told instead that they had lost by a point after a hastily convened Central Council meeting in a nearby hotel.
The “and Mairéad must score” moment at the end of the 1966 final when Mairéad Carabine doubled on a falling ball to send it inches over the crossbar when a goal would have earned a replay for Antrim against Dublin.
Sue Cashman's equalising point for Antrim in the 1967 final; they won the replay with a great display by Mairéad McAtamney.
Wexford's breakthrough victory in 1968
The display by Liz Garvan in bringing Cork back to the podium in 1970, scoring 3-6 of Cork's 5-7 in the final.
The 1973 season when the All-Ireland championship reverted to its original format, the open draw.
Cally Riordan of Cork becoming the only person male or female to win two All Ireland medals in the one day when appearing for both Junior and Senior teams in the 1973 finals.
Kilkenny's emergence after a replayed final in 1974, with the help of a winning goal by Ursula Grace and a player of the match performance from a young Angela Downey.
Gretta Quigley's performance in captaining Wexford to victory in 1975 the day after she was married
Cork's last gasp point from Mary O’Leary, sister of Seánie, to win the 1982 final.
Angela Downey's famous goal in 1989, scored despite the fact she lost both hurley and skirt as she bore down on goal.
Lynn Dunlea's three goals in the 1993 final.
Linda Mellerick's last minute goal in 1995 to secure Cork's victory over Kilkenny.
Galway's breakthrough victory in 1996 with two goals from 18-year-old Denise Gilligan
Irene O'Keeffe's two first half goals in 1998 to help Cork win the first final to be shown live on television.
Tipperary's breakthrough victory in 1999, with the 14-year-old Claire Grogan on the team, and retention of title the following year with two early goals from Deirdre Hughes and subsequent rivalry with Cork. Tipperary won five All Irelands in six years. 
Six goals exchanged in the 2012 All-Ireland Senior Camogie Championship, which is considered to be one of the best games of all time with Wexford running out winners in the end, with Ursula Jacob scoring 2-7 of Wexford's 3-13.
Galway's first All-Ireland since 1996 in the 2013 All-Ireland Senior Camogie Championship and Therese Maher's stand out performance as she got her elusive medal after 16 years

All-Ireland Senior Camogie Finals
Click on the year for details and team line-outs from each individual championship.
The first numeral in the scoreline of each team is the number of goals scored (equal to 3 points each) and the second numeral is the number of points scored, the figures are combined to determine the winner of a match in Gaelic games. Match duration was raised from 40 minutes to 50 minutes for the 1934 championship and subsequent championships up to 1987, and from 50 minutes to 60 minutes for the 1988 and subsequent championships. The points bar was removed for the 1979 and subsequent championships. Teams were increased from 12-a-side to 15-a-side for the 1999 and subsequent championships.

See also
 All-Ireland Senior Hurling Championship
 National Camogie League
 Camogie All Stars Awards
 Ashbourne Cup

References

External links
 "All-Ireland Senior Camogie Championship: Roll of Honour", RTÉ, 9 May 2008

 
1